Richard Mahl (28 August 1898 Orissaare, Saare County – 26 June 1964 Tallinn) was an Estonian chemist.

In 1930, he graduated from Leningrad Polytechnical Institute in chemistry.

1948–1951, he was the rector of Tallinn Polytechnical Institute.

References

1898 births
1964 deaths
Estonian chemists
Academic staff of the Tallinn University of Technology
Rectors of universities in Estonia
People from Orissaare
Estonian communists
Burials at Metsakalmistu